Torsten Raspe (born 1 August 1969) is a retired German football midfielder who played for Hallescher FC Chemie, SSV Ulm 1846, Stuttgarter Kickers, Rot-Weiß Erfurt and VfL Kirchheim/Teck.

He was a part of the East German squad at the 1989 FIFA World Youth Championship, playing all three matches.

References

External links
 
 

1969 births
Living people
German footballers
East German footballers
Hallescher FC players
SSV Ulm 1846 players
Stuttgarter Kickers players
FC Rot-Weiß Erfurt players
2. Bundesliga players
Association football midfielders
VfL Kirchheim/Teck players
People from Merseburg
Footballers from Saxony-Anhalt